The 1928–29 City Cup was the thirty-first edition of the City Cup, a cup competition in Northern Irish football.

The tournament was won by Linfield for the 14th time.

Group standings

References

1928–29 in Northern Ireland association football